Marta Calamonte Márquez (born 30 July 1982) is a Spanish rhythmic gymnast, born in Mérida. She competed at the 2000 Summer Olympics in Sydney.

Notes

References

External links

1982 births
Living people
People from Mérida, Spain
Sportspeople from the Province of Badajoz
Spanish rhythmic gymnasts
Olympic gymnasts of Spain
Gymnasts at the 2000 Summer Olympics